Jiazhuang is a town of Jingxing Mining District, Shijiazhuang, Hebei province, China, located in the north of the district. , it has 10 residential communities under its administration.

See also
List of township-level divisions of Hebei

References

Township-level divisions of Hebei